Linlang (International title: Deception) is a 2006 Philippine television drama suspense series broadcast by GMA Network. The series is the sixth installment of Now and Forever. Directed by Mac Alejandre, it stars Lorna Tolentino, Diana Zubiri and Rudy Fernandez. It premiered on July 24, 2006 replacing Duyan. The series concluded on September 22, 2006 with a total of 45 episodes. It was replaced by Dangal in its timeslot.

Cast and characters

Lead cast
 Lorna Tolentino as Lorena Castrillo
 Rudy Fernandez as Arman Barrinuevo
 Chanda Romero as Gina Dimaano
 Chynna Ortaleza as Jane Vergara

Supporting cast
 Dion Ignacio as Danny Villamonte
 Polo Ravales as Paolo Ramos
 Miguel Tanfelix as Pepe Javier
 Antonio Aquitania as Samuel Reyes
 Alessandra De Rossi as Brenda Villarreal
 Efren Reyes, Jr. as Boyong Calderon
 Terence Baylon as Ricky Sebastian-Valdez
 Eva Darren as Sister Stella
 Diana Zubiri as Divina Agustin
 Kyle Danielle Ocampo as Maddie Reyes

References

External links
 

2006 Philippine television series debuts
2006 Philippine television series endings
Filipino-language television shows
GMA Network drama series
Television shows set in the Philippines